The 1990–91 Greek Football Cup was the 49th edition of the Greek Football Cup.

Tournament details
Totally 72 teams participated, 18 from Alpha Ethniki, 18 from Beta, and 36 from Gamma. It was held in 6 rounds, included final.

After the Group stage, there were interesting confrontations and many "protagonists" were eliminated by the competition continue. In the Second round, Olympiacos were eliminated by PAOK , Aris by Athinaikos and Iraklis by Xanthi, while in the Third round AEK Athens were eliminated by OFI. In the same round, Edessaikos, a Beta Ethniki team, reversed their loss 4–0 by Ionikos, achieving a draw with the same score in the second leg, in order however to be eliminated in penalty shootout.

The Final was contested by Panathinaikos, for sixth time in the last 10 years, after the qualify against PAOK in semi-finals, and neophyte in Alpha Ethniki Athinaikos, for first and unique until now time in their history. That year, HFF decided the establishment of a two-legged final match, according to the model of Coppa Italia. Athinaikos selected as home of first match Apostolos Nikolaidis Stadium, instead of their neutral home, Municipal Stadium of Vyronas, while the second match became in the Athens Olympic Stadium. Panathinaikos won both matches and at the same time The Double.

Athinaikos, as finalist of competition, participated in the next season's European Cup Winners' Cup, for first and unique time in their history. Nikos Sarganis, Athinaikos goalkeeper, that had played in the first match of Final, failed to win the Cup with a fourth team, after Kastoria, Olympiacos and Panathinaikos. The second match was the last for referee Meletis Voutsaras. For the fourth consecutive season, Dimitris Saravakos was the competition's top scorer, with 10 goals.

Calendar

Group stage

The phase was played in a single round-robin format. Each win would gain 2 points, each draw 1 and each loss would not gain any point.

Group 1

Group 2

Group 3

Group 4

Group 5

Group 6

Group 7

Group 8

Group 9

Group 10

Group 11

Group 12

Group 13

Group 14

Group 15

Group 16

Knockout phase
Each tie in the knockout phase, was played over two legs, with each team playing one leg at home. The team that scored more goals on aggregate over the two legs advanced to the next round. If the aggregate score was level, the away goals rule was applied, i.e. the team that scored more goals away from home over the two legs advanced. If away goals were also equal, then extra time was played. The away goals rule was again applied after extra time, i.e. if there were goals scored during extra time and the aggregate score was still level, the visiting team advanced by virtue of more away goals scored. If no goals were scored during extra time, the winners were decided by a penalty shoot-out. The mechanism of the draws for each round is as follows:
There are no seedings, and teams from the same group can be drawn against each other.

Bracket

Round of 32

|}

Round of 16

|}

Quarter-finals

|}

Semi-finals

|}

Final

The 47th Greek Cup Final was double-played this season. First leg was played at the Leoforos Alexandras Stadium, and second leg at the Olympic Stadium.

First leg

Second leg

References

External links
Greek Cup 1990–91 at RSSSF

Greek Football Cup seasons
Greek Cup
Cup